Allyson Ingram Walts (born October 7, 1963) is an American former professional tennis player.

A native of Scottsdale, Ingram was an Arizona state singles champion during her time at Saguaro High School. She played collegiate tennis for both Oklahoma State University and Arizona State University.

Ingraham had a best singles ranking of 304 in the world and made her WTA Tour main draw debut at the 1987 Virginia Slims of Arizona.

Her husband, Butch Walts, was also a professional tennis player.

ITF finals

Doubles: 1 (0–1)

References

External links
 
 

1963 births
Living people
American female tennis players
Arizona State Sun Devils women's tennis players
Oklahoma State Cowgirls tennis players
Tennis people from Arizona
Tennis players from Scottsdale, Arizona